William James Bunce Morris (born ) is a former Welsh Rugby Union player who was born in Bow Street, Cardiganshire. He is the third player known as Bill Morris to play for Wales.

Bill Morris attended Aberaeron Bilateral School before attending Cardiff Teacher Training College at the Heath. He played for Aberystwyth RFC. and Llanelli Scarlets 1959-1960
He was recommended to Pontypool for the 1962-63 season by his club and by Pontypool club captain Clive Rowlands. Bill won The British Indoor Championship 1962 100 yards in 9.8 seconds and went on to represent Great Britain against Germany Indoor at Wembley in 1962. Described as running under 'even time' (100 yards in 10 seconds, equivalent to about 11 seconds for 100 metres) "one of the fastest wings in Wales". As a Rugby Union winger he played two internationals making his Welsh debut in Scotland v Wales at Murrayfield, 2 February 1963 and his last appearance in the following test Wales v Ireland at Cardiff, 9 March 1963.

References 

1940 births
Living people
Rugby union players from Ceredigion
Rugby union wings
Welsh rugby union players